Jeremy Browne (born 1970) is a British politician.

Jeremy Browne may also refer to:

Jeremy Browne, 11th Marquess of Sligo (1939–2014)

See also
Jeremy Brown (disambiguation)